InterWorx is web hosting control panel software developed by InterWorx LLC. The application is divided into two interfaces: NodeWorx, which can be utilized by a server administrators to manage a server, and SiteWorx, can be utilized by a website owner to manage a particular web site. The NodeWorx interface also contains functionality for web hosting resellers to manage multiple SiteWorx accounts without allowing the ability to manage server daemons and configurations.  

Application-based support includes Apache, PHP, MySQL, Perl, and Djbdns (DNS). Email based support includes POP3, IMAP, SMTP services using Qmail. InterWorx is accessed via HTTPS on port 2443.

In addition to a web-based user interface, InterWorx functions can be managed via a command line or API. InterWorx requires a dedicated server or virtual private server. System requirements of InterWorx are minimal, as it may run server clusters on Raspberry Pi devices using the ARM chipset.

History 

InterWorx was originally developed as an internal project of web host Nexcess in the early 2000's, and was spun off to form an independent company (InterWorx LLC) in 2004. The product is currently developed and maintained by a development team located in Pittsburgh, PA.

Features

The InterWorx control panel comes equipped with most standard web hosting control panel features, with additional focus on load balancing and server clustering in a Comparison of web hosting control panels.

References

External links 

 InterWorx website

Web applications
Website management
Web server management software